Mohamad Ali bin Mohamad (Jawi: محمد علي بن محمد) is a Malaysian politician. He is the Deputy President of the Dewan Negara since 16 December 2020 and Member of Dewan Negara since 20 May 2020. He is also a member of the United Malays National Organisation (UMNO), a party which is aligned with the ruling Perikatan Nasional (PN) coalition and component party of the Barisan Nasional (BN) coalition.

Election results 
{| class="wikitable" style="margin:0.5em ; font-size:95%"
|+ Malacca State Legislative Assembly     
!|Year
!|Constituency
!colspan=2|
!|Votes
!|Pct
!colspan=2|Opponent(s)
!|Votes
!|Pct
!|Ballots cast
!|Majority
!|Turnout
|-
|rowspan=3|2021
|rowspan=3|N11 Sungai Udang, P136 Tangga Batu
|rowspan=3  |
|rowspan=3|Mohamad Ali Mohamad (UMNO)
|rowspan=3 align="right" |6,259
|rowspan=3| 40.24%
|bgcolor=""|
|Mohd Aleef Yusof (BERSATU)
|align="right" |6,789
|43.65%
|rowspan=3|15,554
|rowspan=3|530 
|rowspan=3|68.24%
|-
| | 
|Hasmorni Tamby (PKR)
|align="right" |2,035
|13.08% 
|-
| |
|Mohd Zahar Hashim (IND)
|align="right" |471
|3.03%
|}

Honours
  :
  Companion Class I of the Order of Malacca (DMSM) - Datuk (2017)
  :
  Knight Companion of the Order of the Crown of Pahang (DIMP) – Dato' (2013)
  Grand Knight of the Order of Sultan Ahmad Shah of Pahang (SSAP) – Dato' Sri''' (2015)

References

Living people
Place of birth missing (living people)
Members of the Dewan Negara
Year of birth missing (living people)